Yauyos–Chincha Quechua or Yauyos Quechua is a dialect cluster of Quechua, spoken in the Yauyos and Chincha districts of Peru. There are numerous dialects: in Yauyos, San Pedro de Huacarpana, Apurí, Madean-Viñac (Madeán), Azángaro-Huangáscar-Chocos (Huangáscar), Cacra-Hongos, Tomás-Alis (Alis), Huancaya-Vitis, Laraos, with similar diversity in Chincha.

The Tana-Lincha (Lincha) dialect included by Ethnologue 16, however, is part of Cajamarca-Lambayeque Quechua.

References

Bibliography

Online Dictionaries 
 Yauyos–English (Aviva Shimelman)
 Yauyos–Castellano (Aviva Shimelman)

External links 

Gerald Taylor: Two stories in Quechua of Laraos (Yauyos) with Spanish translation
 
Texts in Yauyos Quechua at IMDI / ISLE Metadata Initiative, collected by Aviva Shimelman (registration necessary)
Yauyos Quechua Collection of Aviva Shimelman on AILLA (registration necessary)
Yauyos Quechua Linguistic Materials, SCL 2018–15, Survey of California and Other Indian Languages, University of California, Berkeley, https://dx.doi.org/doi:10.7297/X2610XHN

Languages of Peru
Quechuan languages